Cortinarius quarciticus is an agaric fungus of the genus Cortinarius found in Europe. It was described as new to science in 1994.

See also
List of Cortinarius species

References

External links

quarciticus
Fungi described in 1994
Fungi of Europe